Harald Gimpel (born 6 September 1951 in Wallendorf, Saxony-Anhalt) is a former East German slalom canoeist who competed in the 1970s. He won the bronze medal in the K-1 event at the 1972 Summer Olympics in Munich.

Gimpel also won two bronze medals at the 1975 ICF Canoe Slalom World Championships in Skopje in the K-1 event and the K-1 team event.

References

1951 births
Canoeists at the 1972 Summer Olympics
German male canoeists
Living people
Olympic canoeists of East Germany
Olympic bronze medalists for East Germany
Olympic medalists in canoeing
Medalists at the 1972 Summer Olympics
Medalists at the ICF Canoe Slalom World Championships